Captivating: Unveiling the Mystery of a Woman's Soul is a book published in 2005 by John Eldredge and his wife Stasi. The book rejects the idea of an ideal woman and explores biblical scripture from the view that God desires woman to embrace her glory, rather than fear her femininity. Captivating is a companion to Wild at Heart, also by John Eldredge, and argues that its model of femininity complements men's innate desires for a battle to fight, an adventure to live, and a beauty to rescue.

The authors use scriptural analysis, personal experience and interviews with others as the basis for their argument. The book has received considerable criticism from people both within and outside the Christian sphere. Many argue that the authors' personal experiences add too much bias to a book intended to address wide human conditions; many others find fault with the authors' scriptural analyses.

External links 
 Amazon.com reviews
 Critical Review
 Christianity Today's critique of Captivating
 Review of Captivating
 Who's Captivating Whom?
 Captivating: A Biblical Critique
 Created to be Captivating?
 Review of Captivating (Reformed Baptist perspective)

2005 non-fiction books
Christianity and women
Thomas Nelson (publisher) books